Archar may refer to:
 Archar (village), in Bulgaria
 Archar River, in Bulgaria
 Archar Peninsula, in Antarctica

See also 
 Archer (disambiguation)